Antoine Longoudé (born 22 August 1962) is a boxer from the Central African Republic. Longoudé competed for his country at the 1984 Summer Olympics as a welterweight. He was defeated by Romanian Rudel Obreja in the first round.

References

1962 births
Living people
Welterweight boxers
Central African Republic male boxers
Boxers at the 1984 Summer Olympics
Olympic boxers of the Central African Republic